Pablo Tomeo Félez (born 23 January 2000) is a Spanish footballer who plays as a midfielder for SD Huesca.

Club career
Born in Alloza, Teruel, Aragon, Tomeo was an Andorra CF youth graduate, and made his senior debut during the 2016–17 campaign, as his side suffered relegation from Tercera División. In 2018, he moved to SD Huesca and returned to youth football.

Tomeo first appeared with Huesca's reserves during the 2019–20 campaign, helping in their promotion to the fourth tier after 42 years, and being a regular starter in their second consecutive promotion, to the newly-formed Segunda División RFEF. He made his first team debut on 12 August 2022, starting in a 0–0 Segunda División away draw against Levante UD.

References

External links

2000 births
Living people
Sportspeople from the Province of Teruel
Spanish footballers
Footballers from Aragon
Association football midfielders
Segunda División players
Segunda Federación players
Tercera División players
Divisiones Regionales de Fútbol players
SD Huesca B players
SD Huesca footballers